= Impact of non-fungible tokens on traditional businesses =

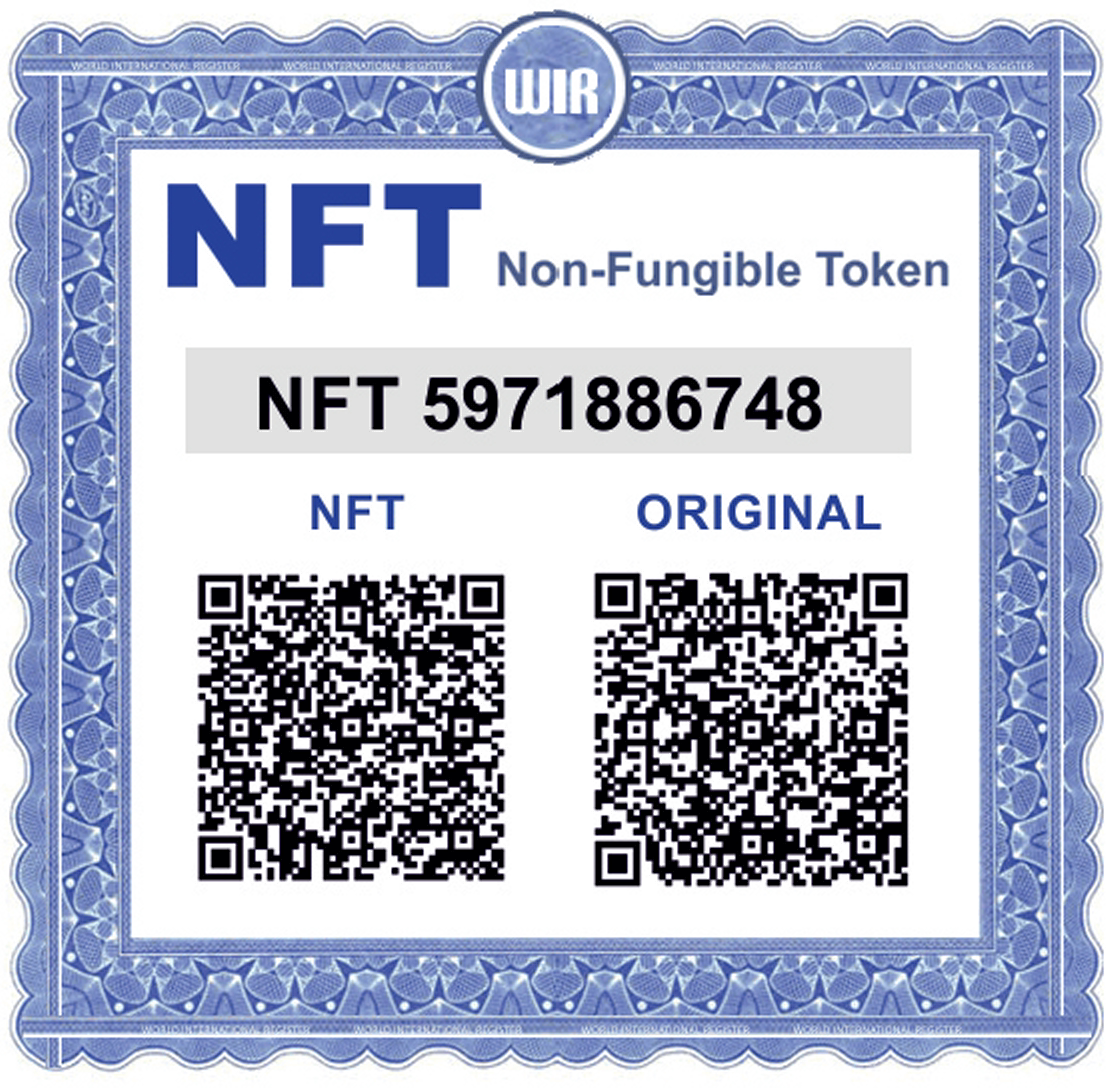
NFT token sample

The impact of Non-Fungible Tokens (NFTs) on traditional businesses is quantifiable in several distinct operational, transactional, and economic variables within multiple industry sectors. NFTs, characterized by their indivisibility and uniqueness, are registered on a blockchain.

== Impact across industries ==
=== Art and collectibles ===
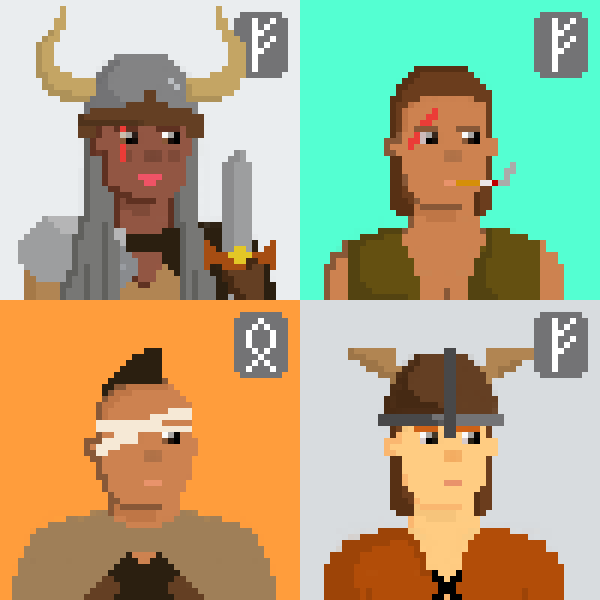
VeKings art

NFTs facilitate the buying, selling, and ownership of digital art on blockchain platforms, enabling artists to monetize their digital creations without physical reproduction. NFTs have enabled a notable shift in the economic dynamics of digital art transactions, allowing artists to receive compensation that potentially reflects the market value of their work more accurately.

NFTs are also utilized to denote ownership of physical art, enabling digitization of ownership and transaction logs.

=== Music industry ===
Utilizing smart contracts, NFTs can automate the distribution of royalties upon secondary sales, ensuring artists obtain a predetermined percentage. The embedded smart contracts within NFTs enable transparent and pre-agreed upon royalty distributions, reducing potential disputes and ensuring that original creators are compensated for subsequent sales. This transparency and assurance of financial compensation upon resale is a novel development in compensatory mechanisms within the music industry.

=== Gaming ===
Game developers leverage NFT sales as a financing mechanism, providing early backers with unique, often utility-based, digital assets.
